Luis Enrique Nsue Ntugu Akele (born 16 January 1998) is an Equatorial Guinean professional footballer who plays as a centre back for Tunisian Ligue Professionnelle 1 club EO Sidi Bouzid and the Equatorial Guinea national team.

Club career
Nsue is a Cano Sport Academy product. He also played for CDB FB Atlético Puertollano and Aravaca CF  in Spain.

International career
Nsue has represented Equatorial Guinea at the 2019 Africa U-23 Cup of Nations qualification. made his international debut for Equatorial Guinea on 28 May 2018.

References

External links

1998 births
Living people
People from Ebibeyin
Equatoguinean footballers
Association football central defenders
Cano Sport Academy players
EO Sidi Bouzid players
Divisiones Regionales de Fútbol players
Tunisian Ligue Professionnelle 1 players
Equatorial Guinea international footballers
Equatoguinean expatriate footballers
Equatoguinean expatriate sportspeople in Spain
Expatriate footballers in Spain
Equatoguinean expatriate sportspeople in Tunisia
Expatriate footballers in Tunisia
Fang people